David John Foley (born 12 May 1987) is an English footballer. He played in the Football League for Hartlepool United and in the North American Soccer League for the Puerto Rico Islanders and the Fort Lauderdale Strikers.
Known for being captain of The Westoe F.C.

Career

England
Foley was trained as a scholar in Hartlepool United's youth academy. As a scholar, he represented the first team on several occasions and became Hartlepool's youngest ever player when he came on as a substitute against Port Vale at the age of 16. Foley also played a key role in Hartlepool's Under 19s Dallas Cup winning team in 2004. During his time at the club Foley failed to score a league goal. However, he was more successful in cup competitions, scoring seven goals, most notably against Premier League side Stoke City which earned Hartlepool a famous 2–0 victory in 2009.

When his first-team appearances started to become limited Foley joined Conference National side Barrow on a month's loan in August 2009, he played three times but failed to score.

North America
In February 2010 Foley's Hartlepool contract was cancelled so he could join the Puerto Rico Islanders. After playing for the team throughout the 2010 pre-season, he made his debut for the team on 16 April 2010, in a 2010 CFU Club Championship game against Haitian team Racing des Gonaïves.

Foley signed with the Fort Lauderdale Strikers in January 2013. He dressed in 5 games for the club and scored 2 goals before picking up a season-ending injury. On 10 March 2014, the Strikers announced that the club and Foley had officially parted ways by mutual agreement.

Return to England
After leaving Fort Lauderdale Strikers, Foley returned to England, and in June 2015 he joined hometown club South Shields on a free transfer. He scored on his competitive debut for the club on 8 August, but it was not enough to prevent a 3–2 defeat against Northallerton Town in the Northern League Division Two. He netted again for the Mariners three days later, with his stunning 25-yard volley sealing a 3–2 win against Billingham Town after Shields had earlier found themselves 2–0 down with 12 minutes to play. He also scored in Shields' next game, notching the opener in a 6–0 win over Darlington Railway Athletic. He suffered a hamstring injury against Heaton Stannington on 18 August, and returned as a substitute in a win over Ryhope Colliery Welfare on 6 October.

He went on to play a key part in a successful season for the Mariners, as they gained promotion to Division One of the Northern League as champions.

In June 2017, Foley turned down a new contract at South Shields to join National League North side Spennymoor Town, indicating his desire to play at a higher level. He scored eight league goals in total for Spennymoor. However, on 6 September 2018, Foley re-joined South Shields. On 31 October 2019 it was confirmed, that Foley had left the club for final time due to work commitments.

Honours

Club
Hartlepool United
League Two runners-up: 2006–07

Puerto Rico Islanders
 USSF Division 2 Pro League: 2010
 CFU Club Championship: 2010, 2011

South Shields
 Northern League Division Two champions: 2015–16

References

External links
 In The Mad Crowd profile
 Vital Hartlepool Profile: David Foley
 
 Foley's Strikers profile

1987 births
Living people
Footballers from South Shields
English footballers
Association football forwards
Association football midfielders
Hartlepool United F.C. players
Barrow A.F.C. players
Puerto Rico Islanders players
Fort Lauderdale Strikers players
South Shields F.C. (1974) players
Spennymoor Town F.C. players
English Football League players
National League (English football) players
USSF Division 2 Professional League players
North American Soccer League players
Northern Football League players
English expatriate footballers
Expatriate footballers in Puerto Rico
British expatriates in Puerto Rico